Tay Yong Kwang is a Singaporean judge of the Supreme Court. He was first appointed Judicial Commissioner in 1997, appointed Judge in 2003, and appointed Judge of Appeal in 2016. He was noted for being the presiding judge in several notable cases (especially murder) that shocked the nation and made headlines in Singapore.

Notable cases

Public Prosecutor v Zhou Jian Guang and Another
In April 2000, as Judicial Commissioner, Tay Yong Kwang became the presiding judge of the kidnapping trial of Zhou Jian Guang and Shi Song Jing, the two illegal immigrants from China who were involved in the kidnapping a 14-year-old girl for ransom. Zhou, Shi and the mastermind Vincent Lee Chuan Leong committed the crime on 9 September 1999 when they abducted the teenager while she was on her way home at Bukit Timah, and she was confined for three days before her father paid a ransom of $330,000, allowing her to be released sixty hours after her abduction. All three kidnappers were arrested within a few days after the girl's release.

Tay, in his judgement, found that the death penalty was inappropriate given that the kidnappers did not harm the girl and treated her well during her confinement, save for the trauma she suffered and the verbal threat they made on her safety and life. He decided to sentence both Zhou and Shi to life imprisonment. He also did not impose caning on the two Chinese men, having noted that the mastermind Lee also did not receive caning when he himself was similarly sentenced to life in prison by another judge Chan Seng Onn in a separate trial session.

SIA embezzlement scandal
Between 9 February 1987 to 18 January 2000, over a period of 13 years, Singapore Airlines cabin crew supervisor Teo Cheng Kiat misappropriated an approximate sum of S$35 million from his company. Teo joined Singapore Airlines as a clerk in May 1975 and was promoted to cabin crew supervisor in 1988. It was his job at that time to oversee the allowance payments to the cabin crew. Teo siphoned money off the payments and transferred them to his bank accounts while doctoring records of the cabin members on the flights, using names of those who did not fly on the various flights to conceal his criminal activities. He also manipulated his wife and younger sister to allow him to gain control of their bank accounts and transfer the money he embezzled to their bank accounts. It was due to an internal audit error that led to the arrest of a 47-year-old Teo on 19 January 2000. On 30 June 2000, High Court judicial commissioner Tay Yong Kwang found Teo guilty of ten charges of criminal breach of trust and sentenced him to 24 years in prison.

The criminal case of Anthony Ler

On 14 May 2001, 34-year-old Anthony Ler Wee Teang hired a 15-year-old youth to assassinate his wife, 30-year-old Annie Leong Wai Mun, who was in the midst of divorcing him, so that he can become the sole owner of their flat and himself gain custody of their then-4-year-old daughter. In December 2001, Judicial Commissioner (JC) Tay Yong Kwang, who presided the case, found Ler guilty and sentenced him to death for masterminding the murder while sentencing the unnamed boy to indefinite detention for the crime because the boy was underage and cannot be hanged. JC Tay stated that he did not believe Ler's plea of innocence and pointed out the evidence proving Ler's motive to commit the crime, stating Ler's act of crying at his wife's funeral were nothing more than "rehearsed acts performed by an accomplished actor" and called the boy's story "truthful"; he also said that the boy was not a cold-blooded killer, but was a teenager who was manipulated by an adult experienced in the ways of the world and adult machinations. Ler was hanged in December 2002 while the boy went on to spend 17 years in prison at the President's Pleasure before his release in December 2018 by the order of the President of Singapore, who granted clemency for him and remitted the remaining part of his sentence.

Murder of football player Sulaiman bin Hashim

On 31 May 2001, a 17-year-old footballer Sulaiman bin Hashim, together with his two friends, were attacked by a 8-member, all Malay Salakau gang at South Bridge Road. Sulaiman was grievously assaulted by the Salakau gang members while his other two friends managed to flee and call the police. Sulaiman was killed in the gangfight, with two fatal knife wounds out of the thirteen he suffered being the cause of his death. Within the next 13 months, six of the gang members involved were arrested and eventually sentenced to jail and caning for culpable homicide, rioting and voluntarily causing grievous hurt, while the remaining two assailants were never caught till today. One of these gang members, 22-year-old Muhamad Hasik bin Sahar, stood trial before JC Tay Yong Kwang in the High Court on 9 May 2002.

After pleading guilty to a reduced charge of culpable homicide not amounting to murder (or manslaughter), Hasik was sentenced to life imprisonment and 16 strokes of the cane by Tay, who backdated the sentence to the date of Hasik's arrest on 15 June 2001. Before the incident, Hasik was previously convicted of causing hurt with dangerous weapons, and sentenced to reformative training at the age of 16 in 1996. When delivering his verdict, and having made reference to Hasik's criminal records, JC Tay felt that Hasik has not "learnt his lesson" even after his previous experience in court, and now that he has committed a crime of greater violence and an innocent life has been lost as a result, the judicial commissioner felt that it was not inappropriate to have Hasik jailed for life. In his words, JC Tay reiterated in his judgement:

Those who feel victorious in being vicious and who have no qualms about the annual celebration of one's birth culminating in the untimely death of another will have to spend all subsequent birthdays within prison walls until such time as they are eligible for parole.

Later, in August 2002, Hasik's appeal for a lighter sentence was rejected by the Court of Appeal.

The case of Chia Teck Leng
In April 2004, Judicial Commissioner Tay Yong Kwang, who upgraded as a High Court judge the year before, would sentence 44-year-old Chia Teck Leng, a compulsive gambler and finance manager from Asia Pacific Breweries (APB), to a total of 42 years' imprisonment for Singapore's then biggest case of commercial fraud after convicting him of 14 out of 46 charges of criminal breach of trust, citing that the $117 million he swindled out of four foreign banks was "enough to feed many people for life".

Kallang River Body Parts Murder

Another case was 50-year-old Leong Siew Chor, who strangled his 22-year-old lover Liu Hong Mei to death and cut up her body into seven pieces before disposing them at the Kallang River. Leong's alleged motive was that he wanted to avoid Liu from discovering that he had stolen her ATM card and stolen all her savings of more than $2,000 and report him, which might risk expose his secret love affair to his wife and three children and other people known to him. Justice Tay sentenced Leong to death in 2006 after founding him guilty of murder as he rejected Leong's defence that Liu willingly allowed him to strangle her as a way of a lover's suicide pact. He stated that Liu, who was young and intending to pursue a polytechnic diploma in tourism, excited to attend her sister's wedding etc., would not have any reason to commit suicide. Tay said in his judgement, “In the classic tragic tale of ill-fated love, the luckless lover committed suicide. Here, Romeo killed Juliet. It was a most disgusting and despicable murder. Liu Hong Mei died a very cruel, heartbreaking death.” Leong was subsequently hanged on 30 November 2007, after the failure of his appeal and clemency plea to the Court of Appeal and President of Singapore respectively.

"One-eyed Dragon" Tan Chor Jin

On 15 February 2006, with the help of his driver accomplice and childhood friend Lim Choon Chwee (alias Ah Chwee), 39-year-old gunman Tan Chor Jin, alias Tony Kia, forcefully entered the Serangoon flat of 41-year-old nightclub owner Lim Hock Soon (unrelated to Lim Choon Chwee) and pointed a gun at Lim and his family, threatening them and intending to rob them, as well as to settle scores with Lim on some unsettled issues. After robbing the family of their valuables, and telling Lim to tie up his wife, maid and then-13-year-old daughter, Tan told Lim to go into his study while the others gone to other rooms. Tan then proceed to fire his gun at Lim six times (one of the shots missed), and Lim, who sustained five gunshot wounds on his back, left arm, left thigh, right cheek and right temple, died as a result of the fatal gunshot wound at his right temple.

Tan, who managed to escape Singapore with the help of Malaysian Ho Yueh Keong, was arrested in Kuala Lumpur ten days later, after he was listed on the international police wanted list in light of the shooting. Initially charged with murder, Tan was subsequently brought to trial in the High Court on an amended charge of unlawfully discharging a firearm under the Arms Offences Act, which also warrants the mandatory death penalty like murder. Tan did not find a lawyer to represent himself in his defence, and defended himself in the trial, becoming the first man in more than 16 years to conduct his own defence when facing the death penalty in Singapore. Despite putting up a defence that he was drunk and he fired the gun accidentally and did it in self-defence when Lim tried to use a chair to attack him (which is not possible since Lim's hands was also tied up at that time before his death), Justice Tay Yong Kwang rejected his defence, calling his actions were of “assured and accomplished assassin”, and called his story of accidental shooting a laughable fantasy, since it required strength to pull the trigger. Tay sentenced Tan to death after finding him guilty as charged.

Tan later engaged veteran lawyer Subhas Anandan to represent him in his appeal, and the appeal was met with failure subsequently in January 2008. On 5 January 2009, Tan lost his final appeal to the President of Singapore for clemency, and four days later, 42-year-old Tan Chor Jin was hanged. As an aftermath of the incident (including Tan's execution), Ho Yueh Keong, who went on the run for 9 years before his arrest in Kuala Lumpur in July 2015, was sent to jail for 20 months for helping Tan escape Singapore, and Lim Choon Chwee was also imprisoned for 6 months for failing to report a robbery after receiving a discharge not amounting to an acquittal for abetment of murder.

Dave Teo Ming
On 2 September 2007, 20-year-old National Serviceman Dave Teo Ming sparked a 20-hour-long nationwide manhunt when he went AWOL, with a SAR-21 assault rifle, eight rounds of ammunition and a knife. The purpose of Teo's AWOL was due to him wanting to kill Crystal Liew, Teo's girlfriend who broke up with him in April that same year, as well as five others whom Teo hated in his life. After his arrest, Teo faced multiple charges under the Arms Offences Act. Teo's fellow serviceman, Ong Boon Jun, who was in company of Teo who was possessing a rifle, was charged under the Act as well. At Teo's trial, it was revealed that Teo had an unhappy childhood and had experienced several tragedies in his life (including his mother abandoning him to his grandparents, parental abuse, the death of his then-12-year-old younger brother from a car accident in March 2001). These events caused Teo to encounter disciplinary problems and also led to him suffering from depression, according to an IMH report. Teo had finally snapped after his girlfriend dumped him, which drove him to commit the crime. It was further reported that while Teo was in remand, Teo's grandmother died from cancer.

On 9 July 2008, Justice Tay Yong Kwang, who heard Teo's case in the High Court, convicted Teo (who pleaded guilty to his crimes) of the charges he faced, and sentenced him to 9 years and 2 months' imprisonment and 18 strokes of the cane. During sentencing, Justice Tay expressed his sympathy towards Teo for his unfortunate circumstances, advising him to turn over a new leaf while in prison. In his words, he said to Teo:

'My heart hurts for you that so young a man will have to spend some of the best years of his life in prison and have to undergo so many strokes of the cane, but I trust that you understand a deterrent sentence is unavoidable in the circumstances.

Dave (Teo), you have had a very hard life. I hope that this unfortunate and traumatic wrong turn in your life will make you much more mature and a whole lot wiser and that you will spend the next few years reconstructing your young life.

I hope that you will pursue your studies, listen to good advice from counsellors and learn many skills while in prison and that, upon your release, you will have a life full of meaning and purpose to honour the memory of your grandmother and your beloved younger brother.

It has been written, 'To everything there is a season'. There was a time when you loved, there came a time when you hated. There was a time when you felt you wanted to kill, now is the time for you to heal. There was a time you were broken down, now is the time to build yourself up. There was a time when you were at war in your being, now is the time to restore peace within.'

As for Ong Boon Jun, he was sentenced to 6 years and 6 months' imprisonment and 6 strokes of the cane for being in company with a person in an unlawful possession of a firearm; Ong later lost his appeal for a lighter sentence.

Downtown East slashing

Tay Yong Kwang was the judge who heard the case relating to the death of 19-year-old Republic Polytechnic student Darren Ng Wei Jie. The student was the victim of a gang-related murder that occurred on 30 October 2010 in Downtwon East, where 12 members of a rival gang attacked Ng and slashed him with knives and choppers and screwdrivers, which led to Darren suffering from a total of 28 knife wounds on his head, neck, chest and limbs, one of which was fatal and caused Darren to bleed to death. Seven people were convicted of rioting while the other five people, including the mastermind Stilwell Ong Keat Pin, who were charged with murder, stood trial before Justice Tay Yong Kwang in 2012.

At the trial in July 2012, the murder charges were reduced to culpable homicide and Tay convicted the five people accordingly. Tay reserved the sentencing until 8 September, and during the sentencing, the judge reportedly said that it was as heartbreaking for the court as it must have been for the parents watching the proceedings. He said in court as he passed the sentences on the five youths, "I can only implore especially on behalf of all parents, young persons in secret societies and street gangs to open their eyes to the tragic truth that violence begets violence and vicious acts only breed more vicious reactions." The five people were in the end sentenced to lengthy jail terms ranging from 8 to 12 years and to caning between 10 and 12 strokes of the cane, with the mastermind Stilwell Ong receiving the most severe sentence among all the five youths.

The re-trial of Kho Jabing

On 17 February 2008, two Malaysians from Sarawak, Kho Jabing and Galing Anak Kujat, robbed two Chinese construction workers in Geylang, and one of them, 40-year-old Cao Ruyin was severely bludgeoned on the head by Kho Jabing, then aged 24; Cao died from his severe head and brain injuries six days later in a coma. Kho and Galing were tried for murder, and were both condemned to hang in 2010 by the High Court of Singapore for the robbery and murder. Following an appeal in 2011, Galing Kujat's conviction was reduced to robbery with hurt and his death sentence was commuted to 18 and a half years in jail with 19 strokes of the cane, while Kho failed to escape the gallows when his appeal was rejected. However, the execution was postponed due to the Singapore government deciding to review the mandatory death penalty laws for capital murder (and capital drug trafficking) in Singapore.

After the Singapore government removed the mandatory death penalty in January 2013 for crimes of murder with no intention to kill and offers an alternative sentence of life imprisonment with/without caning and a chance for all death row inmates to reduce their sentences, Kho Jabing applied to the Court of Appeal to have a chance to reduce his death sentence. In May 2013, the Court of Appeal approved Kho's application and sent his case back to the High Court for re-sentencing, and a re-trial was conducted soon after. Although it was ruled that for Kho's re-sentencing, the original trial judge should review the case, however, at this point of time, High Court judge Kan Ting Chiu, the original trial judge for Kho's case, was retired since 2011 and so it was another High Court judge, who was none other than Tay Yong Kwang himself, who took over as the presiding judge for Kho's re-trial.

At the re-trial, as he was not the original trial judge for Kho's murder trial, Justice Tay referenced Justice Kan's written verdict from 2010, as well as that of the Court of Appeal from 2011 in order to reach his decision in this case. On 14 August 2013, Tay decided that the death sentence was not appropriate for Kho as he had taken into consideration Kho's young age (24 years old) at the time of the offence and his choice and use of weapon during the robbery, which was "opportunistic and improvisational", and there is an unclear sequence of events on that night, as noted by the Court of Appeal's verdict. As such, Tay overturned Kho Jabing's death sentence and sentenced him to life in prison and 24 strokes of the cane, making Kho the second convicted murderer on death row to escape the gallows.

However, the prosecution, who earlier sought the death penalty at the re-trial, appealed against Tay's decision to impose a life term with caning for Kho on the basis of the brutal nature of the crime, and the appeal was heard before five judges in the Court of Appeal. The prosecution's appeal was narrowly accepted by a 3-2 vote on 14 January 2015 and this led to Kho Jabing being once again sentenced to death, reason being the majority of the five judges (three of them) felt that the crime was vicious and was committed with a blatant disregard for human life, which made it more appropriate to impose a death sentence rather than a life sentence on Kho. On 20 May 2016, more than 8 years after Cao Ruyin's murder, 32-year-old Kho Jabing was hanged in the gallows after a final reunion and farewell with his family from Sarawak.

Kovan Double Murders

Tay presided over the trial of the Kovan Double Murders, which a police officer, Senior Staff Sergeant Iskandar bin Rahmat, murdered father and son, Tan Boon Sin and Tan Chee Heong, at Kovan in 2013

On 4 December 2015, Justice Tay Yong Kwang sentenced Iskandar to death after founding him guilty of the double murder charges. He rejected Iskandar's claims of self-defence and that the killings was a result of a robbery gone wrong, because the injuries on the victims were inflicted on vital parts of the body and the force used were too excessive for self-defence etc., which clearly shown that Iskandar has intended to cause death and silence the victims upon the discovery of his monstrous acts. The elder Tan suffered from a has a completely degenerated cartilage at his right knee, which made him having difficulty to walk or getting up from a sitting position. This also shown that, as what the prosecution argued, the elder victim could not have possibly be able to charge at Iskandar. Also Tan Chee Heong was around 30 kg lighter than Iskandar (even though he was 4 cm taller than the 173-cm-tall Iskandar), so the younger victim was not really physically threatening to him.

After the loss of his appeal in 2017 and clemency plea in 2019, Iskandar remains on death row since, and his execution date has yet to be decided as of May 2021.

References

External links
Supreme Court of Singapore website

Singaporean Judges of Appeal
Singaporean people of Chinese descent
National University of Singapore alumni
Living people
1956 births